John Mills (3 June 1836 – 24 February 1899) was an Australian cricketer. He played one first-class match for New South Wales in 1857/58.

See also
 List of New South Wales representative cricketers

References

External links
 

1836 births
1899 deaths
Australian cricketers
New South Wales cricketers
Sportspeople from Hampshire
People from Botley, Hampshire